Jerod X. Evans (born January 16, 1994) is an American football quarterback who is a free agent. He played college football at Virginia Tech and signed with the Philadelphia Eagles as an undrafted free agent following the 2017 NFL Draft.

Early years
Evans attended Mansfield High School in Mansfield, Texas.

College career
Evans played for the United States Air Force Academy in 2013 before tearing his ACL and transferring to Trinity Valley Community College. After two years at Trinity Valley he transferred to Virginia Tech. In his first year at Virginia Tech in 2016 he was named the starting quarterback. In his first start he threw for 221 yards and four touchdowns against  Liberty. In his first season at Virginia Tech he completed the regular season with 26 touchdown passes and 5 interceptions. Evans also broke the record for total offense in a season, previously held by Logan Thomas, leading Virginia Tech to the 2016 ACC Championship game against Clemson with a 9-3 (6-2 Coastal) record. In the 2016 Belk Bowl Evans led Virginia Tech to overcome a school record 24 point deficit with 330 all-purpose yards. Evans' 2016 season set school records for most passes completed (263), most touchdowns thrown (28), most touchdowns thrown in a game (5), most passing yards, and highest completion percentage.

On January 2, 2017, Evans announced that he was foregoing his senior year and entering the 2017 NFL Draft, but he ended up undrafted.

Statistics

Professional career

Philadelphia Eagles
Evans signed with the Philadelphia Eagles as an undrafted free agent on May 11, 2017. He suffered a foot injury in the first week of rookie minicamp and was waived/injured by the Eagles and placed on injured reserve on May 14, 2017. He was waived from injured reserve on May 22, 2017 with an injury settlement.

Green Bay Packers
On October 17, 2017, Evans was signed to the Green Bay Packers' practice squad. He was released on December 19, 2017.

The Spring League
In March 2018, Evans was named as a quarterback for the East team in the 2018 edition of The Spring League, a developmental showcase and scouting event for current NFL free agents.

Washington Valor
On May 22, 2018, Evans was assigned to the Washington Valor. On July 2, 2018, he was placed on reassignment.

Baltimore Brigade
On March 6, 2019, Evans was assigned to the Baltimore Brigade.

Washington Valor
On April 12, 2019, Evans was traded to the Washington Valor.

Tokyo Gas Creators
In 2021, Evans joined the Tokyo Gas creators of Japan's XLeague.

Carolina Cobras
In 2022, Evans joined the Carolina Cobras of the National Arena League (NAL).

Vegas Knight Hawks
On April 28, 2022, Evans signed with the Vegas Knight Hawks of the Indoor Football League (IFL). He was released on June 15, 2022.

Northern Arizona Wranglers
On June 20, 2022, Evans was signed by the Northern Arizona Wranglers.

Personal
Evans' brother Caleb was a former starting quarterback for the University of Louisiana - Monroe Warhawks, and now is starting quarterback for the Ottawa Redblacks of the Canadian Football League.

References

External links
Virginia Tech Hokies bio

1994 births
Living people
Players of American football from Dallas
American football quarterbacks
Trinity Valley Cardinals football players
Virginia Tech Hokies football players
Philadelphia Eagles players
Green Bay Packers players
The Spring League players
Washington Valor players